Micah Lewensohn ((August 27, 1952, In Jerusalem - March 20, 2017 in Tel Aviv) was an Israeli theater director and actor.

Biography
Lewensohn was a graduate of the Israeli Music Conservatory in Tel Aviv.
During his army years he was a senior editor-producer in the IDF Radio where he also hosted numerous radio programs and served as a military correspondent in the Yom Kippur War (1973) and later in the 1st Lebanon War (1982).

After completing his studies at New York University Film School (BA) and Theater Directing (MFA) – he received a National Endowment for the Arts grant, serving as the Assistant General Director at the Pittsburgh Public Theater.

Since his return to Israel in 1980, he directed over 50 productions in all theaters in Israel.

His productions won several theater prizes: best play, best musical, best revival as well as best director awards.

Directing for the Theater
 Mourir by Sergi Belbel, Beit Zvi, School of the Performing Arts, 2012
 West Side Story by A. Laurents, L. Berenstein & S Sondheim, Beit Zvi, School of the Performing Arts, 2011
 The Policeman by Daniel Lapin based on Ephraim Kishon's film The Policeman, Habima Theatre. 2009
 Who's Afraid of Virginia Woolf by Edward Albee, Cameri Theater. 2008
 Alma and Ruth by Goren Agmon, Beit Lessin Theater. 2008
 Mike by Gadi Inbar, Beit Lessin Theater. 2008
 The History Boys by Alan Bennett, Beit Lessin Theater. 2007
 Death of a Salesman by Arthur Miller, Cameri Theater. 2007
 Badenheim 1939 – A special project for an Orchestra, actors and dancers. Based on
 The Producers by Mel Brooks and Thomas Meehan, Cameri Theater. 2006
 Iron by Rona Munro, Beit Lessin Theater. 2005
 The Glass Menagerie by Tennessee Williams, Cameri Theater. 2005
 Mikveh by Hadar Galron, Beit Lessin Theater. 2004
 Mirale Efrat by Yacob Gordin, Beit Lessin Theater. 2003
 The Dresser by Ronald Harwood, Cameri Theater. 2003
 My Fair Lady by Frederick Loewe and Alan Jay Lerner, The Israeli Opera. 2002
 Rembetiko by Costas Ferris, Haifa Theater. 2002	
 Romantics by Hanoch Levin, Cameri Theater. 2002
 Copenhagen by Michael Frayn, Cameri Theater 2001
 Don Giovanni (Opera) by MOZART, The Israeli Opera, Tel Aviv. 2001
 A View from the Bridge, by Arthur Miller, Habima Theatre. 1999
 Cooper, by Yoseph Bar Yoseph, Beit Lessin Theater Theater. 1998
 Taking Sides by Ronald Harwood, Cameri Theater 1996
 Bianka, by Miriam Kayni, Beit Lessin Theater Theater. 1995
 Shmaryahu by Ilana Luft, The Children’s Theater. 1994
 M. Butterfly, by David Henry Hwang, Beer Sheva Theater.
 Andora by Max Frisch, Haifa Theater. 1993
 Singer by Peter Flannery, Beer Sheva Theater. 1992
 The Prisoner of Second Avenue, by Neil Simon, Beit Lessin Theater Theater. 1992
 Relatively Speaking, by Alan Ayckbourn, Beit Lessin Theater Theater. 1991
 Guys & Dolls, by Frank Loesser, Haifa Theater & Roni Productions.1991
 The Odd Couple (female version), by Neil Simon, Beit Lessin Theater Theater. 1990
 Mephisto, based on K. Mann’s novel, Beer Sheva Theater. 1990
 Lettice & Lovage by Peter Shaffer, Cameri Theater 1990
 The Foreigner, by Larry Shue, Beit Lessin Theater Theater. 1989
 Comedy of Errors, by William Shakespeare, Beer Sheva Theater. 1989
 Breaking the Code by Hugh Whitemore, Cameri Theater 1988
 Under the Web, by Julia Kearsleye, Beer Sheva Theater. 1988
 Death of a Salesman by Arthur Miller, Beer Sheva Theater. 1987
 Hunting Scenes by Martin Spear, Beer Sheva Theater. 1987
 The Suicide by Nicholas Erdman, Beer Sheva Theater. 1986
 Biboff by Yossi Hadar, Habima Theatre. 1987
 La fille du régiment (The Daughter of the Regiment)(Opera) by Gaetano Donizetti, Opera Company of Boston. 1985
 Himself and His Son by  I.D. Berkowitz, Beer Sheva Theater 1985
 The Front Page by Ben Hecht and Charles MacArthur, Beer Sheva Theater 1984
 The Elephant Man by Bernard Pomerance, Beer Sheva Theater 1984
 Between Bells, by Dan Almagor, Beit Lessin Theater Theater. 1984
 City Sugar by Stephen Poliakoff, Beer Sheva Theater 1983
 Drums in the Night by Bertolt Brecht, Beer Sheva Theater 1982
 Hatasha - Rock Musical by Benny Hadar, Haifa Theater 1981
 Dance of Death by August Strindberg, Haifa Theater 1980
 Beckett Project, Pittsburgh Public Theater. 1979

Additional Activities
Alongside his work in the theater, Lewensohn directed entertainment spectacles, musical events and commercials. Among his projects:
 Narrator The Land Shall Not Rest - TV documentary series marking 40 years to the Yom Kippur War. (2013)
 Director & storyteller  The Chain of Generations - museological video installation, Western Wall Heritage Center, Jerusalem, (Recipient of the 2008 Thea Award, USA for outstanding achievement. (opened 2005)
 Performer (Video installation) Hertzl Museum Visitors Center, Jerusalem (opened 2005)
 Narrator Slaves of the Sword  - co-produced by Bellfilms-Israel, BBC-U.K, ZDF/ARTE - Germany/France. (2003)
 Artistic Director Love in Jerusalem, Music Festival (2002)
 Host & Interviewer of TV series recorded at the Jazz Blues & Videotape Festival (40 episodes for channel 2 Israel). (2001)
 Artistic Director By My Spirit, A Universal Spiritual Gathering in Toledo, Spain of which the highlight was a concert of the Israeli  Philharmonic Orchestra with Placido Domingo, conducted By Maestro Zubin Mehta. (1992)
 Concept & Choreography - The Lazy Bums, Israel’s representative to the Eurovision Song Contest, Brussels, Belgium. (1987)
 BBC TV directing course under a grant from the British Council. (1990)
 Taught acting and directing at the Tel Aviv University, Beit Zvi, Sam Spiegel Film and Television School and at Seminar Hakibbutzim.
 Artistic Director, The Israel Festival, Jerusalem  (1994-2001)
 General Director, Beit Zvi School of the Performing Arts in Ramat Gan, (2009-2014)
 Lewensohn played a supporting role in Joseph Cedar’s 2011 film, Footnote, nominated for an Academy Award in the category of Best Foreign Film.

Translations
From English to Hebrew
 The Gin Game by Donald L. Coburn (for Habima Theatre). 2009
 Who's Afraid of Virginia Woolf by Edward Albee, ( for the Cameri Theater). 2008
 The Glass Menagerie by Tennessee Williams ( for the Cameri Theater). 2004
 Iron by Rona Munro (for Beit Lessin Theater). 2003
 The Dresser by Ronald Harwood (for the Cameri Theater). 2003
 Talking with... by Jane Martin (for Beit Zvi, School of the Performing Arts). 1987
 Buried Child by Sam Shepard ( for the Khan Theater, Jerusalem). 1984

On the board of directors of
The Suzanne Dellal Centre for Dance and Theatre, Tel Aviv.
AICE - Australia Israel Cultural Exchange.
Bezalel Academy of Arts and Design, Jerusalem.
Since May 2009 serves as Director of the Beit Zvi School of the Performing Arts.

Death 
Micah Lewensohn died in his home on March 20, 2017. He was 64 years old. He is survived by his wife Rachel, two children, and two grandchildren.

References

External links
 

1952 births
2017 deaths
Israeli theatre directors